Bertil Johansson (politician)  (2 August 1930 – 3 January 2018) is a Swedish politician. He was a member of the Centre Party and a member of the Parliament of Sweden.

References

Members of the Riksdag from the Centre Party (Sweden)
1930 births
2018 deaths
20th-century Swedish politicians
Members of the Riksdag 1970–1973
Members of the Riksdag 1974–1976
Members of the Riksdag 1976–1979